Lobesia genialis is a moth of the family Tortricidae. It is found in Thailand and Sri Lanka.

Lobesia genialis is very similar to Lobesia fetialis; the two species can be separated by differences in the male genitalia. The horns of the gnathos are pointed, and the lower angle of the cucullus is projecting.

References

Moths described in 1912
Olethreutini